Monti Sharp (born September 20, 1967 in Monroe, Louisiana) is an American actor, best known for his role as David Grant on 
the daytime US drama Guiding Light. Sharp received professional actor training at the University of North Carolina School of the Arts.

Career
Sharp was the first actor to portray David Grant on the CBS daytime soap opera Guiding Light, which he appeared in from 1992 to 1995. In 1993, he won the Daytime Emmy Award for Outstanding Younger Actor in a Drama Series for his role in GL. He has also appeared in The City (1996) as James, As the World Turns (1997–1998) as Dr. Lewis McCloud, and General Hospital (1998–1999) as Justus Ward.

On stage, he starred in the Off-Broadway premiere of Cheryl West's play ''Before It Hits Home, as Junior.

References

External links

1967 births
African-American male actors
American male soap opera actors
American male television actors
Daytime Emmy Award winners
Daytime Emmy Award for Outstanding Younger Actor in a Drama Series winners
Living people
Male actors from Louisiana
People from Monroe, Louisiana
21st-century African-American people
20th-century African-American people